Lisa Lackner (born 7 October 1982) is an Austrian professional racing cyclist who rides for Vitalogic Astrokalb Radunion Nö.

See also
 List of 2016 UCI Women's Teams and riders

References

External links
 

1982 births
Living people
Austrian female cyclists
Place of birth missing (living people)
21st-century Austrian women